The 1987 Wimbledon Championships was a tennis tournament played on grass courts at the All England Lawn Tennis and Croquet Club in Wimbledon, London in the United Kingdom. It was the 101st edition of the Wimbledon Championships and were held from 22 June to 5 July 1987.

Prize money
The total prize money for 1987 championships was £2,119,780. The winner of the men's title earned £155,000 while the women's singles champion earned £139,500.

* per team

Champions

Seniors

Men's singles

 Pat Cash defeated  Ivan Lendl, 7–6(7–5), 6–2, 7–5 
 It was Cash's only career Grand Slam title.

Women's singles

 Martina Navratilova defeated  Steffi Graf, 7–5, 6–3 
 It was Navratilova's 45th career Grand Slam title and her 8th Wimbledon title.

Men's doubles

 Ken Flach /  Robert Seguso defeated  Sergio Casal /  Emilio Sánchez, 3–6, 6–7(6–8), 7–6(7–3), 6–1, 6–4 
 It was Flach's 4th career Grand Slam title and his 2nd Wimbledon title. It was Seguso's 3rd career Grand Slam title and his 1st Wimbledon title.

Women's doubles

 Claudia Kohde-Kilsch /  Helena Suková defeated  Betsy Nagelsen /  Elizabeth Smylie, 7–5, 7–5 
 It was Kohde-Kilsch's 2nd and last career Grand Slam title and her only Wimbledon title. It was Suková's 2nd career Grand Slam title and her 1st Wimbledon title.

Mixed doubles

 Jeremy Bates /  Jo Durie defeated  Darren Cahill /  Nicole Provis, 7–6(12–10), 6–3 
 It was Bates' 1st career Grand Slam title and his only Wimbledon title. It was Durie's 1st career Grand Slam title and her only Wimbledon title.

Juniors

Boys' singles

 Diego Nargiso defeated  Jason Stoltenberg, 7–6(8–6), 6–4

Girls' singles

 Natasha Zvereva defeated  Julie Halard, 6–4, 6–4

Boys' doubles

 Jason Stoltenberg /  Todd Woodbridge defeated  Diego Nargiso /  Eugenio Rossi, 6–3, 7–6(7–2)

Girls' doubles

 Natalia Medvedeva /  Natasha Zvereva defeated  Kim Il-soon /  Paulette Moreno, 6–2, 5–7, 6–0

Singles seeds

Men's singles
  Boris Becker (second round, lost to Peter Doohan)
  Ivan Lendl (final, lost to Pat Cash)
  Mats Wilander (quarterfinals, lost to Pat Cash)
  Stefan Edberg (semifinals, lost to Ivan Lendl)
  Miloslav Mečíř (third round, lost to Anders Järryd)
  Yannick Noah (second round, lost to Guy Forget)
  Jimmy Connors (semifinals, lost to Pat Cash)
  Andrés Gómez (fourth round, lost to Henri Leconte)
  Henri Leconte (quarterfinals, lost to Ivan Lendl)
  Tim Mayotte (third round, lost to Mikael Pernfors)
  Pat Cash (champion)
  Brad Gilbert (third round, lost to Alexander Volkov)
  Joakim Nyström (third round, lost to Jakob Hlasek)
  Emilio Sánchez (fourth round, lost to Mats Wilander)
  David Pate (second round, lost to Slobodan Živojinović)
  Kevin Curren (second round, lost to Johan Kriek)

Women's singles
  Martina Navratilova (champion)
  Steffi Graf (final, lost to Martina Navratilova)
  Chris Evert (semifinals, lost to Martina Navratilova)
  Helena Suková (quarterfinals, lost to Pam Shriver)
  Pam Shriver (semifinals, lost to Steffi Graf)
  Gabriela Sabatini (Quarerfinals, lost to Steffi Graf)
  Manuela Maleeva-Fragnière (second round, lost to Dianne Balestrat)
  Claudia Kohde-Kilsch (quarterfinals, lost to Chris Evert)
  Bettina Bunge (third round, lost to Rosalyn Fairbank)
  Lori McNeil (second round, lost to Natasha Zvereva)
  Catarina Lindqvist (fourth round, lost to Claudia Kohde-Kilsch)
  Wendy Turnbull (second round, lost to Sharon Walsh-Pete)
  Barbara Potter (second round, lost to Mary Joe Fernández)
  Katerina Maleeva (first round, lost to Gigi Fernández)
  Raffaella Reggi (fourth round, lost to Helena Suková)
  Sylvia Hanika (fourth round, lost to Pam Shriver)

References

External links
 Official Wimbledon Championships website

 
Wimbledon Championships
Wimbledon Championships
June 1987 sports events in the United Kingdom
July 1987 sports events in the United Kingdom